The Show Must Go is Canadian pop rock group Hedley's third studio album and was released on November 17, 2009, in Canada. The album was successful, producing three top 20 singles, with the lead track, "Cha-Ching", and eighth track, "Perfect" both hitting the top 10. The album was later released in the US on December 7, 2010.

Track listing

Personnel
Credits for The Show Must Go adapted from AllMusic.

Hedley
 Jacob Hoggard – vocals, acoustic guitar, keyboard
 Dave Rosin – electric guitar, textures, background vocals
 Tommy Mac – bass, background vocals
 Chris Crippin – drums, background vocals

Additional musicians
 Brian Howes - keyboard, guitar, background vocals
 Jason Van Poederooyen - keyboard, percussion
 Joel Straton - background vocals
 Jay Benson - percussion
 John Feldmann - background vocals, percussion
 David Benedeth - percussion
 Dan Korneff - keyboard
 David Eggar - cello
 Jonathan Dinklange - violin
 The Late Show's Gospel Choir - vocals
 Dave Genn - guitar, keyboard, background vocals
 Darren Parris - bass
 Kelly Brock - background vocals
 Brian Davies - trumpet
 Mark D'Angelo - trumpet
 James Hopson - trombone
 James Robertson - french horn
 April White - background vocals

Production
 Misha Rajaratnam - editing
 Tom Lord-Alge - mixing
 Brian Howes - producing
 Jason Van Poederooyen - programming, engineering, editing
 Kyle Moorman - engineering
 Erik Ron - engineering
 John Feldmann - string arrangements, programming, producing
 Mike Fraser - mixing
 David Benedeth - producing
 John Bender - engineering, editing
 Kato Khandwala - engineering, editing
 John D'uva - engineering, editing
 Dan Korneff - engineering, editing, programming
 Dean Maher - engineering
 Dave Genn - producing

Awards and nominations

Charts and certifications

Weekly charts

Year-end charts

Certifications

Release history

Tours

The Show Must Go... on the Road Tour

Hedley announced a tour across Canada in support of the album. Fefe Dobson and Stereos were supporting acts for the entire tour, while Boys Like Girls supported the dates from March 28 to April 10, and Faber Drive supported the other eight dates. A live album called Go With the Show was released in a CD/DVD pack on November 9, 2010. The CD contains tracks from the three final destinations of the tour, as well as a documentary and bonus features on the DVD.

A second leg was announced on May 25, 2010. The opening acts touring with the band are San Sebastian, These Kids Wear Crowns, and Lights.

Setlist
 "Cha-Ching"
 "On My Own"
 "Shelter"
 "She's So Sorry"
 "Perfect"
 "Old School"
 "Amazing"
 "Saturday"
 "Gunnin'"
 "Don't Talk to Strangers"
 "Friends"
 "Beautiful"
 "321"
 "Never Too Late"
Encore:
 "For the Nights I Can't Remember"
 "Trip"

Tour dates

References

2009 albums
Hedley (band) albums
Universal Music Canada albums
Island Records albums
Albums produced by John Feldmann